Eudora Bumstead (Stone; August 26, 1860 – 1892) was a 19th-century American poet and hymnwriter, remembered as "the children's poet". She began writing rhymes in childhood, and when ten years old was paid  for a poem entitled, "Signs of Spring", which was published in Our Young Folks, then edited by John Townsend Trowbridge. Along with several other young writers, including: C. A. Stephens, William S. Walsh, Robert M. Walsh, Helen Gray Cone, Eleanor C. Donnelly, Mary Sheldon Barnes, Theodora Robinson Jenness, F. ("Fern") Hamilton, and Edwin Roth Champlin ("Clarence Fairfield"), Bumstead got her start as a writer at Our Young Folks.

Early life and education
Eudora Stone was born in Bedford, Michigan, August 26, 1860. When she was young, her parents removed to Nebraska. Her earliest recollections are of the great West, with its prairie billows crested with pleasant homes, its balmy breezes and its sweeping gales. Her parents were highly cultured, and gave her every possible assistance and encouragement. She began to write rhymes in her childhood, and when ten years old a poem she wrote was published in "Our Young Folks". She received a good public school education. In 1878-79, she was a student in the Nebraska State University.

Career
She was for a time a successful school teacher. While attending Nebraska State University, she met William T. Bumstead, whom she married in 1880.  She has had little time for writing but when she did write, it was mostly for the child-readers of St. Nicholas Magazine and The Youth's Companion, having been a special contributor to the latter for several years, writing as Eudora S. Bumstead.

Personal life
Bumstead was of Quaker descent, and is like the Friends in her quiet tastes and sincere manners. She had few friends. Remarkably well-informed and having an analytic mind, she was a keen, though kindly, disputant, accepting nothing as proved which did not stand the test of reason.

The family lived in Beatrice, Nebraska before removing to Ontario, California with their daughter.

She died in 1892, and was buried at Bellevue Memorial Park, Ontario.

Style and themes
Their only son died at the age of two-and-a-half years, but Bumstead did not write of the sadness occasioned by his loss, believing that it is better to spread light and gladness than clouds and sadness.

Selected works

Hymn lyrics
 "The sun has gone from the shining skies"
 "Throw to the wind your doubt and fear"

Song verses
 "Blow, wind, blow", 1888
 "Folliloo"
 "Grievous complaint", 1890 
 "In the swing", 1888 
 "Kandikew", 1886 
 "Little red hen", 1885
 "Mystic sign", 1888
 "Ollie's dreams", 1881
 "Problem in threes", 1889
 "Sad reason for tears", 1889
 "Summer lullaby", 1887
 "Year with dolly", 1892

Poems
 "Little pine-tree", 1889
 "Quest", 1888
 "A Year with Dolly", 1892

Plays
Waiting for Santa Claus, 1889

References

Attribution

External links
 
 

1860 births
1892 deaths
19th-century American poets
19th-century American women writers
19th-century American women musicians
19th-century Quakers
People from Calhoun County, Michigan
Writers from Michigan
Writers from Nebraska
American women poets
American hymnwriters
American women hymnwriters
University of Nebraska–Lincoln alumni
People from Ontario, California
American Quakers
American children's writers
American women children's writers
Wikipedia articles incorporating text from A Woman of the Century